Bucephalandra kishii is a species of flowering plant in the family Araceae, native to Kalimantan on Borneo. It is a facultative rheophyte, found on granite along high altitude riversides.

References

Aroideae
Endemic flora of Borneo
Plants described in 2014